Hartwick Seminary is a hamlet (and census-designated place) in Otsego County, New York, United States. Hartwick Seminary is served by ZIP code 13326.

Per plaques and signs along State Route 28, the hamlet is the original site of the Hartwick Seminary, now Hartwick College. The seminary was founded in 1797 by Rev. John Christopher Hartwick, who located the seminary here in 1816.

References

Hamlets in Otsego County, New York
Hamlets in New York (state)